Lieutenant-General Otto Karl Lorenz von Pirch or Pirch II (23 May 1765 in Stettin in Pomerania – 26 May 1824 in Berlin) was a Prussian officer who fought in the Napoleonic Wars.

Notes

References

1765 births
1824 deaths
Prussian commanders of the Napoleonic Wars
Military personnel from Szczecin
Lieutenant generals of Prussia
People from the Province of Pomerania
Burials at the Invalids' Cemetery